The European 10m Championships are special shooting sport championships for ISSF 10metre air rifle and pistol disciplines. They have been organised by the European Shooting Confederation (ESC) since 1971.

Disciplines
 10 m air pistol
 10 m air rifle

Editions

See also
 European Shooting Confederation
 European Shooting Championships
 ISSF shooting events
 International Shooting Sport Federation

References

External links
 
 European Champion Archive Results at Sport-komplett-de

 
European
Shooting sports in Europe by country